Cuthbert Hamilton Turner  (1860–1930) was an English ecclesiastical historian and Biblical scholar. He became Dean Ireland's Professor of the Exegesis of Holy Scripture in the University of Oxford in 1920.

His major work was Ecclesiae Occidentalis Monumenta Iuris Antiquissima, often known as EOMIA, published in fascicles in the period 1899 to 1939. It is a collection of sources for canon law.

He was educated at Winchester School and New College, Oxford. He became a Fellow of New College, Oxford in 1889.

Works 
 The oldest manuscript of the Vulgate Gospels (Oxford 1931)
 The Gospel according to St. Mark : introduction and commentary
 Studies in Early Church History; Collected Papers
 The Study of the New Testament; an inaugural lecture delivered before the University of Oxford on October 22 and 29, 1920
 Ecclesiae Occidentalis monumenta iuris antiquissima cahonum et conciliorum graecorum interpretationes latinae
 The History and Use of Creeds and Anathemas in the Early Centuries of the Church

References
Concise Dictionary of National Biography

External links

The contents of his Ecclesiae Occidentalis Monumenta Iuris Antiquissima.
An index to Ecclesiae Occidentalis Monumenta Iuris Antiquissima.
The announced reprint of the Ecclesiae Occidentalis Monumenta Iuris Antiquissima by Georg Olms Verlag.

1860 births
1930 deaths
British biblical scholars
Alumni of New College, Oxford
Fellows of New College, Oxford
Dean Ireland's Professors of the Exegesis of Holy Scripture
Fellows of the British Academy